is a Japanese anime television series about gymnastics. The series was produced by MAPPA, written by Shigeru Murakoshi and directed by Hisatoshi Shimizu. Character designs were created by Kasumi Fukagawa, and the music its composed by Masaru Yokoyama. The series aired from October to December 2020 on TV Asahi's  block.

The series is licensed by Funimation. Medialink licensed the anime in South and Southeast Asia.

Plot
In 2002, the Japanese men's gymnastics team is not doing well. Jotaro Aragaki is a professional gymnast and former Olympian. However, despite being good in the past, he was never able to get a gold medal. As he suffered a shoulder injury and is an older athlete at 29 years old, his coach, Noriyuki Amakusa, suggests he retires. While considering retirement, Jotaro takes his daughter Rei to Edo Wonderland. While there, they encounter a foreigner dressed up as a ninja, who after following them home, introduces himself as Leo. Later, while announcing his retirement at a press conference, Jotaro changes his mind half way through and decides to continue to pursue a career in gymnastics.

Characters

Jotaro is a gymnast nicknamed "The Samurai" who belongs to Yotsuba Sports. Due to being in a slump, he had been considering retiring from gymnastics until he changes his mind during an interview.

Leonardo is a former ballet dancer nicknamed "The Ninja" who after encountering Jotaro and his daughter Rei at Edo Wonderland follows them home and befriends them. He is being pursued by people in black suits for reasons relating to his ballet career. He is known as "Leo".

Tetsuo is a 17-year-old gymnast nicknamed "The Bandana Prince" who is considered to be the up and coming star. After Jotaro's press conference where he changes his mind about retiring, Tetsuo confronts and calls him "a disappointment".

Noriyuki is Jotaro's long time gymnastics coach and friend.

Rei is Jotaro's daughter. Despite being in the 4th grade, she is very mature and manages the house while Jotaro is away.

Mari is Jotaro's mother and Rei's grandmother. She lives with both Jotaro and Rei.

Tomoyo was Jotaro's wife and Rei's mother as well as a former actress. She died prior to the start the series.

Bigbird is a South American bird and the pet of the Aragakis. Bigbird can speak and seems to have a basic comprehension of Japanese. Bigbird was initially a gift from Mari to Rei.

Tomoki is a gymnast and Jotaro's junior at Yotsuba Sports.

Ayu is a girl who works as a bartender for Mari and dresses in a ganguro style.

Naohiko is Tetsuo's coach and is often referred to as "Tecchan".

Atsushi is a young gymnast who has a reputation for being good at the pommel horse.

Shige is a young gymnast who has a reputation for having good upper body strength.

Hiro is a young gymnast who goes to Shirando University. He is known for his meticulous technique and in previous years won both the All Japan Championships and the NHK Cup.

Ryū is a Chinese gymnast who has represented China in the Olympic Games. His gymnastics skills surpass those of Tetsuo.

Kitty is a Chinese gymnast who is a fan of the actress Tomoyo Aragaki, who was Jotaro's wife and Rei's mother until her death.

Britney is an acupuncturist who treated Jotaro and helped his shoulder injury.

Episode list

Notes

References

External links
Anime official website 

Anime with original screenplays
Funimation
Gymnastics in anime and manga
MAPPA
NUManimation
Medialink
TV Asahi original programming